San Giovenale Triptych is a 1422 painting by Italian Renaissance artist Masaccio, housed in the Masaccio Museum of Sacred Art at Cascia di Reggello, in the Metropolitan City of Florence.  The triptych is the first work attributed to Masaccio and the earliest known painting essay using the geometric Renaissance perspective.

Description 
The Triptych is a tempera on wooden panels .

At the bottom of the panels, the inscriptions are in modern humanist letters for the first time in Europe, not inscribed in Gothic characters:

(ANNO DO)MINI MCCCCXXII A DI VENTITRE D'AP(RILE) - [April 23, 1422] - under the central panel

(PLE)NA DOMINUS. TECUM. BENEDICTA - on the throne step

and traces of the saints' names on the side panels.

The central panel shows the Madonna enthroned with two angels and the child Jesus. The halo of the Madonna bears the Shahada written backwards. The left panel depicts Saint Bartholomew and Saint Blaise, and the right panel depicts Saint Anthony Abbot and Saint Juvenal (Giovenale). The left and right panels show a marked influence of 14th-century models, while the center panel's complex perspective has been something new for its time. Also, the use of three-dimensional solidity makes the painting revolutionary for its time.

History 
Masaccio painted the Triptych when he was 21 years old, probably commissioned by the family of Castellani or by that of Carnesecchi for the small church of San Giovenale,  from the Romanic Church at Cascia di Reggello. The presence on the painting of the eponymous saint confirms its original location. Furthermore, the church is about 20  km from Castel San Giovanni in Altura (San Giovanni Valdarno), Masaccio's birthplace.

The Triptych remained in San Giovenale Church for centuries until its rediscovering in 1961. The work was in a state of poor preservation, and the first who took care of it was the art historian Luciano Berti. After 27 years, meanwhile kept in the superintendency's storage areas, it was placed in the Romanesque church of San Pietro a Cascia, and then in 2002, in the Museum of Sacred Art.

References

External links 
 Masaccio Museum of Sacred Art
600th anniversary website
Piccoli Grandi Musei 
Masaccio Museum in Reggello
 Visit Reggello

Paintings by Masaccio
1422 paintings
Paintings of the Madonna and Child
Paintings of Anthony the Great
Triptychs
Angels in art
Paintings of Bartholomew the Apostle